Phalaeops is a genus of East African nursery web spiders that was first described by Carl Friedrich Roewer in 1955.  it contains only two species, found only in Djibouti and Mozambique: P. mossambicus and P. somalicus.

See also
 List of Pisauridae species

References

Araneomorphae genera
Pisauridae
Spiders of Africa
Taxa named by Carl Friedrich Roewer